Montaña Blanca is a mountain on the Canary Island of Tenerife. This makes the Montaña Blanca the third highest peak in Tenerife after the Pico del Teide and the Pico Viejo.

Formation
The Montaña Blanca is a flank volcano of the Pico del Teide, whose name is due to the beige color of the light-colored pumice on its surface. It was created by volcanic processes that took place around 50 BC, in three phases. Initially, phonolitic lava with a volume of about 0.022 km³ emerged from a west-northwest-east-southeast trending eruption fissure system on the east flank of the Pico del Teide. The eruption then transitioned into an explosive sub-Plinian phase, measuring magnitude 4 on the Volcanic Explosivity Index. Within 7 to 11 hours, phonolitic pumice and ash (approximately 0.25 km³ DRE) descended from a 15 km high eruptive column in a northeasterly direction and covered an area of at least 40 km2. In the third phase, about 0.025 km³ of lava came out, and today's lava dome was formed. The Montaña Blanca subplinian eruption is the only known explosive eruption in the Pico del Teide-Pico Viejo volcanic complex.

Ascent
The Montaña Blanca is an excellent vantage point. It can be easily climbed via a branch from the Sendero trail no. 7 (from the car park on the TF-21 below the Montaña Blanca to the summit of the Teide). The tour can also start at the El Portillo Visitor Center and then take either trails #1 and #6 or #1 and #22 to Sendero #7.

References 

Mountains of the Canary Islands
Geography of Tenerife